harper by Harper's Bazaar (referred to as "harper") is a supplement to the American women's fashion magazine Harper's Bazaar presented in various physical and digital formats.

History
The supplement was introduced at 8:00 AM on February 9, 2015 by Harper's Bazaar editor in chief Glenda Bailey who describes its initial vision as "a contemporary supplement for young women". It was founded as a resurrection of Junior Bazaar, which Harper's Bazaar had published in the 1940s, according to Harper's Bazaar publisher Carol Smith.  According to Folio: Magazine Michael Rondon, the debut 24-page edition was sponsored by Nordstrom. Initially, the supplementary magazine had a print circulation of 375,000—about half its total paid circulation—and digital distribution of 8.1 million.

Format
In 2015, it was produced quarterly with celebrity guest editors from the fashion world for its first three editions in February (Alexa Chung), April (Rosie Huntington-Whiteley) and August (Emily Ratajkowski). Each initial guest editor also served as the subject of a cover story fashion shoot as well as the subject a 24-hour day in the life feature.  According to Adweek Chris O'Shea, the supplement, which will feature a different guest editor with each edition, is a miniature version of the magazine that generates additional revenue by providing a forum for advertisers to promote their wares to "stylish and social millennial women who love to shop". The work is presented as a print insert to Bazaar as well as in a digital media, a social media and shopping media outlet.

Notes

External links
Official website

Lifestyle magazines published in the United States
Quarterly magazines published in the United States
English-language magazines
Harper's Bazaar
Hearst Communications publications
Magazines established in 2015
Women's fashion magazines
2015 establishments in New York City
Magazines published in New York City